Top Gun is an American action drama multimedia franchise based on the 1983 article "Top Guns" by Ehud Yonay, which was adapted into the eponymous 1986 film, written by Jim Cash and Jack Epps Jr. The original film portrays Tom Cruise as Lieutenant Pete "Maverick" Mitchell, a young naval aviator aboard the aircraft carrier , who with his radar intercept officer, LTJG Nick "Goose" Bradshaw, are given the chance to train at the US Navy's Fighter Weapons School at Naval Air Station Miramar in San Diego, California.

Produced and released by Paramount Pictures, Top Gun became a cultural phenomenon, sparking a 500% increase in Navy recruitments the year it came out and, despite receiving mixed reviews, was acclaimed for its groundbreaking visual effects and energetic soundtrack. It was followed by the 2022 sequel film Top Gun: Maverick, which takes place 36 years after the events of the first film and depicts Maverick's reluctant return to the United States Navy Strike Fighter Tactics  Instructor program, where he must confront his past as he trains a group of younger aviators, among them the son of his deceased best friend. Top Gun: Maverick was met with greater critical and commercial success than the original, with praise for its story, performances, emotional weight, and flying sequences.

Films

Released

Future
In May 2022, Miles Teller stated that he had been pitching a follow-up film centered around his character to the studio. The actor referred to his pitch as Top Gun: Rooster. By July of the same year, he stated that he has been having ongoing discussions regarding a sequel with Tom Cruise.

Cast and crew

Cast

Crew and production details

Reception

Box office performance

Critical and public response

Accolades

Music

Soundtracks

Singles
 "Danger Zone"
 "Take My Breath Away"
 "Heaven in Your Eyes"
 "Mighty Wings"
 "Playing with the Boys"
 "Top Gun Anthem"
 "Hold My Hand"
 "I Ain't Worried"

The soundtrack to the original film reached number one in the US charts for five nonconsecutive weeks in the summer and autumn of 1986. It was the best selling soundtrack of 1986 and is still one of the best selling soundtrack albums of all time. The soundtrack spawned two top 10 singles on the US charts, with the song "Danger Zone" by Kenny Loggins peaking at number two and the song "Take My Breath Away" by Berlin reaching number one, the latter of which would also go on to win both the Academy Award for Best Original Song and the Golden Globe Award for Best Original Song. According to Allmusic, the album "remains a quintessential artifact of the mid-'80s", and the album's hits "still define the bombastic, melodramatic sound that dominated the pop charts of the era."

The soundtrack to the sequel featured the singles "Hold My Hand" by Lady Gaga and "I Ain't Worried" by OneRepublic, with the latter becoming a top 10 hit. The score of the film harkened back to the original film's sound and was noted by Zanobard Reviews as a "thoroughly entertaining and incredibly nostalgic musical experience from beginning to end".

Other media

Top Gun also spawned a number of video games for various platforms. The original game was released in 1986 under the same title as the film. It was released on Commodore 64, ZX Spectrum, Amstrad CPC, and Atari ST. Another game, also titled Top Gun, was released in 1987 for Nintendo Entertainment System (NES) and Nintendo VS. System arcade cabinets. In the 1987 game, the player pilots an F-14 Tomcat fighter, and has to complete four missions. A sequel, Top Gun: The Second Mission, was released for the NES three years later.

Another game, Top Gun: Fire at Will, was released in 1996 for the PC and later for the Sony PlayStation platform. Top Gun: Hornet's Nest was released in 1998. Top Gun: Combat Zones was released for PlayStation 2 in 2001 and was subsequently released for the GameCube and Microsoft Windows. Combat Zones features other aircraft besides the F-14. In 2006, another game simply titled Top Gun was released for the Nintendo DS. A 2010 game, also titled Top Gun, retells the film's story. At E3 2011, a new game was announced, Top Gun: Hard Lock, which was released in March 2012 for Xbox 360, PC, and PlayStation 3.

References

 
Paramount Pictures franchises
Mass media franchises introduced in 1986